Joshua Pickering (born 30 November 1996) is a speedway rider from Australia. He rides in the top tier of British Speedway, riding for the King's Lynn Stars in the SGB Premiership, in addition to riding for the Edinburgh Monarchs in the SGB Championship.

Career 
He began his British speedway career riding for Edinburgh in 2017. He began his Championship average at the assessed 5.00 and completed the season with the fifth-highest average of 4.62. By the end of the 2019 season, despite a mid-season injury at Birmingham, his average for the Monarchs was past his assessed average and had reached 6.98. Pickering, however, criticized the Championship league structure as unfair on riders from other countries due to its reduction in their number of matches completed by each team.

While still riding for the Monarchs in the Championship in mid-2021, the Sheffield Tigers signed Pickering for their Premiership team. Co-promoter Damien Bates remarked at the time, "[I]t’s a surprise he’s not had a Premiership place before," replacing then-team member Justin Sedgmen. 

Pickering signed for the King's Lynn Stars ahead of the 2022 Premiership Season. During the 2022 season, he rode for the King's Lynn in the SGB Premiership 2022 and for Edinburgh in the SGB Championship 2022. 

In 2023, he re-signed for King's Lynn for the SGB Premiership 2023 and remained the team captain. He also re-signed for Edinburgh for the SGB Championship 2023.

References 

1996 births
Living people
Australian speedway riders
Edinburgh Monarchs riders
King's Lynn Stars riders
Sheffield Tigers riders